Erich Carl Hugo Adamson (more commonly known as Adamson-Eric; 18 August 1902 – 2 December 1968) was an Estonian artist who worked mainly within the medium of painting in applied art.

Life
Erich Carl Hugo Adamson was born 18 August 1902 in Tartu. He was the fourth child of Jaan and Anna Adamson. After studying in Berlin, Adamson then moved to Paris and studied with such artists as Charles Guérin, Roger Bissière, Moise Kisling, and André Lhote before entering the private academy of Russian artist  in 1925 and concentrating in the media of art deco and Neue Sachlichkeit.

In June–July 1928, Adamson-Eric, along with fellow Estonian artists Eduard Wiiralt and Kristjan Teder finally opened an art exhibition in Tallinn. Adamson's career as an artist spanned nearly four decades. He died in Tallinn, where many of his works are on permanent display in the Adamson-Eric Museum on Lühike jalg Street.

Gallery

External links
Culture.ee – The Adamson-Eric Museum
Neue Sachlichkeit in Estonian Art

1902 births
1968 deaths
People from Tartu
People from the Governorate of Livonia
Hugo Treffner Gymnasium alumni
Burials at Metsakalmistu
20th-century Estonian painters
20th-century Estonian male artists
Soviet artists